is a Japanese cinematographer. At the beginning of his career, he often worked with  pink film directors Takahisa Zeze and Hisayasu Satō. Saitō also worked with all nearly every director of the post-Heavenly King generation at Kokuei studio. Now working mostly in mainstream film, he still often teams up with Zeze.

Career
In his Behind the Pink Curtain: The Complete History of Japanese Sex Cinema, Jasper Sharp writes that Saitō is probably the best cinematographer working in the pink film genre. He is most closely associated with the work of Takahisa Zeze, and Sharp credits Saitō with helping the director bridge the gap between pink and mainstream film. For his work in Zeze's , Saitō was given a special award for Best Cinematographer at the Pink Grand Prix.

Sharp judges that Saitō's work in Zeze's  is his "crowning achievement". In their review of Zeze's , cinematopics.com notes that the beautiful imagery captured by the cinematography of Zeze's "partner", Saitō, adds to the power of the work. Bashing, a film Saitō photographed, was shown in the competition at the 2005 Cannes Film Festival.

Awards
He won the award for best cinematography at the 2016 Mainichi Film Awards for his work on 64: Part I and 64: Part II.

Filmography
Anarchy in Japansuke (1999)
Bashing (2005)
Heaven's Story (2010)
64: Part I (2016)
64: Part II (2016)
The 8-Year Engagement (2017)

References

External links

Living people
Japanese cinematographers
Year of birth missing (living people)